Francesco Sacrati (1567 – September 6, 1623) was a Roman Catholic prelate who served as Archbishop (Personal Title) of Cesena (1622–1623), Cardinal-Priest of San Matteo in Merulana (1621–1623), and Titular Archbishop of Damascus (1612–1622).

Biography 
Francesco Sacrati was born to nobility in Ferrara, Italy in 1567, the son of Camilla and Marquis Tommaso Sacrati. He is the nephew of Ercole Sacrati, Bishop of Comacchio and brother of Alfonso Sacrati, also Bishop of Comacchio. He received his doctorate in utroque iure in both canon and civil law from the University of Bologna. In 1595, he was named Referendary of the Tribunals of the Apostolic Signature of Justice and of Grace. On October 5, 1596, he was appointed Governor of Fano. He was successively appointed as Auditor of the Sacred Palace and on June 25, 1599, the Auditor of the Sacred Roman Rota in which he traveled with Cardinal Pietro Aldobrandini to Florence to welcome Queen Marie de' Medici, the wife of King Henri IV of France.

On November 5, 1612, he was elected during the papacy Pope Paul V of as Titular Archbishop of Damascus. On November 5, 1612, he was consecrated bishop in the Sistine Chapel by Scipione Caffarelli-Borghese, Archpriest of the Arcibasilica di San Giovanni in Laterano, with Fabio Biondi, Titular Latin Patriarch of Jerusalem, and Ulpiano Volpi, Archbishop of Chieti, serving as co-consecrators. On February 12, 1621, he was named Prefect of the Apostolic Datary.  

He was created Cardinal Priest in the consistory of April 19, 1621 during the papacy of Pope Gregory XV and received the red hat and title of San Matteo in Merulana on May 17, 1621. In July 1621, he was named Commander of the Sovereign Military Order of Malta and on March 22, 1622, Commendatory Abbot of San Giovanni di Castagneto (Reggio di Calabria). On May 23, 1622, he was named by Pope Gregory XV as Archbishop (personal title) of Cesena. He participated in the Conclave of 1623 which elected Pope Urban VIII. He died on September 6, 1623 and is buried in the church of San Maria dell'Anima in Rome.

Episcopal succession

References  

 
 
 
 
 

17th-century Italian Roman Catholic titular archbishops
Bishops appointed by Pope Paul V
Bishops appointed by Pope Gregory XV
1567 births
1623 deaths